Serhiy Serhiyovich Ryzhkov (22 June 1958, Mykolaiv – 1 November 2017, Mykolaiv) was a Ukrainian constructor and ecologist, professor, Director of Scientific-Research Institute of Ecology and Energy-saving, Head of Ecology Department, Rector Admiral Makarov National University of Shipbuilding.

 Graduated with excellence in 1981 year Machine building faculty of Nikolaev shipbuilding institute.
 Defended Ph.D thesis in 1985 in the Odessa institute of maritime fleet.
 In 1993 he defended his doctor of technical sciences dissertation in the field of «Ship power plants».
 21 October 2008 was elected as a rector of Admiral Makarov National University of Shipbuilding.

Hobby — badminton, master of sports of Ukraine.

Member of Green Party of Ukraine since 2006 year.

Deputy of Mykolayiv regional council V and VI convocations.

Awards 
 Governmental award of Ukraine in the field of science and technique 2011 year — for creation of universal transport ships and units of ocean technique (In a team)

Примітки

External links
 Admiral Makarov National University of Shipbuilding
 Рижков Сергій Сергійович. Депутати фракції ПЗУ Миколаївської обласної ради
 Вчора професор Рижков прийшов на роботу в НУК вже як ректор
 Професор Сергій Рижков став новим ректором МКІ
 Романовський програв вибори ректора Національного університету кораблебудування Рижкову

1958 births
2017 deaths
Ukrainian ecologists
Academic staff of the Admiral Makarov National University of Shipbuilding
People from Mykolaiv
Laureates of the State Prize of Ukraine in Science and Technology